Hickory Creek is a stream in Nodaway County in the U.S. state of Missouri. A tributary of the Nodaway River, it was named after a nearby grove of hickory trees.

See also
List of rivers of Missouri

References

Rivers of Nodaway County, Missouri
Rivers of Missouri